Subotica Airport ( / Aerodrom Subotica) , also locally known as Bikovo Airport ( / Aerodrom Bikovo), is an airport near the city of Subotica, Serbia. It has one runway that is 1,200 m long and 100 m wide. The airport is mostly used for air sport with active Skydive Drop Zone, Pilot School for Glider pilot license (SPL) and private pilot license (PPL) as well as pilot rating courses : Glider towing STR; Aerobatics ARB; Flight instructor FI and NVFR. The club members are very active in paragliding and power kite piloting, too.  

Aeroklub Ivan Sarić is the operator of Subotica Airport.

Gallery

See also
List of airports in Serbia

External links 
Subotica airport information
Pilot School Subotica ATO
Pilotska Skola Subotica instagram profile
Skydive Subotica instagram profile
Aeroklub Ivan Saric pages

Airports in Serbia
Buildings and structures in Vojvodina
Subotica